Harbor Town is a new urbanist-style neighborhood in Memphis, Tennessee. Harbor Town sits atop 132 acres on a sandbar in the Mississippi River known as Mud Island. It was developed in 1989, and was a collaborative effort of Memphis developer Henry Turley, RTKL of Baltimore, and the Looney Ricks Kiss architectural firm from Memphis.  As stated by the Henry Turley Company, the neighborhood intends to "emphasize the human rather than the automobile." Today, Harbor Town is dense and walkable, sporting traditional row houses, contemporary homes, apartments, shops, restaurants, schools, parks, and a marina.

Geography
Harbor Town is located just northwest of Downtown Memphis, Tennessee on Mud Island along the Mississippi River.

Mississippi River Flood of 2011
Harbor Town was closed to everyone except residents for a short period of time in May 2011 when the Mississippi River reached a level of 48 feet, 14 feet above flood stage. A 5-foot-high emergency levy was built in the afternoon and evening of May 9, 2011, in the west lane of Island Drive.  The east lane remained open in the event that Mud Island had to be evacuated, since Mud Island Drive (the road north of Harbor Town and the only other land access to Mud Island) was under water.  Some homes along Wolf River Harbor had to be evacuated but no major damage was reported.

Notable residents
Among Harbor Town's current and former residents are politicians Harold Ford, Jr., Harold Ford, Sr., Lewis Unglesby, and Myron Lowery. There are many former and current Memphis Grizzlies players and coaches, including Shane Battier, Brian Cardinal, Jake Tsakalaidis, Dahntay Jones and past Grizzlies Head Coaches Marc Iavaroni, Hubie Brown and Mike Fratello. Other present or past residents include Wayne Jackson of the group The Memphis Horns, French opera singer Marie Stephane Bernard, and local entrepreneur Dean Jernigan.

See also
List of neighborhoods in Memphis, Tennessee

References

Neighborhoods in Memphis, Tennessee
Redeveloped ports and waterfronts in the United States
New Urbanism communities